Wife Wanted may refer to:
 Wife Wanted (1915 film), a 1915 American silent short comedy-drama film
 Wife Wanted (1946 film), an American crime film noir